Ashly Burch (born June 19, 1990) is an American voice actress, singer, and television writer. She is known for her roles as Aloy in Horizon Zero Dawn and Horizon Forbidden West, Chloe Price in the Life Is Strange series, Mel in The Last of Us Part II, Tiny Tina in the Borderlands series, the web series Hey Ash, Whatcha Playin'?, Enid from OK K.O.! Let’s Be Heroes, Molly from The Ghost and Molly McGee, and Ash Graven from Final Space.

Early life
Burch grew up in Phoenix, Arizona, and has an older brother named Anthony. Her mother is an immigrant from Thailand. She mentioned her mother was very spiritual, giving food to spirits and praying to them. She credits her career path as a voice actress to playing Metal Gear Solid at age 12. Upon seeing voice actor David Hayter's name alongside that of the main characters, she looked him up and realized that there were actual people who voiced the characters, as she realized that was what she wanted to do as a career. She graduated from Occidental College in Los Angeles in 2012.

Career 
After starting Hey Ash, Whatcha Playin'?, Burch got her first voice acting role when her brother, Anthony Burch, was hired as a writer for Borderlands 2 and he suggested she try out for Tiny Tina. For Life Is Strange, she was cast in the role of Chloe Price, after having also auditioned for the roles of Max Caulfield, Victoria Chase and Kate Marsh. She later said that she was surprised by what she could do and had the "opportunity to do in voiceover."

Burch was a writer on Cartoon Network's Adventure Time. She co-wrote episodes such as "The Hall of Egress" and "Islands Part 4: Imaginary Resources", the latter winning a Primetime Emmy Award. She was also a writer of an Adventure Time graphic novel released in October 2016.

Her work in Life Is Strange and Horizon Zero Dawn won her the 2015 and 2017 Golden Joystick Awards for Best Performance. She was also the host of Geek & Sundry's Unplugged series. Since 2020, she has portrayed Rachel on the Apple TV series Mythic Quest, in which she also serves as a writer. She later described her voicing of Tiny Tina, Chloe, and Aloy as "three seminal step ups" that helped her "become a better actor."

She has voiced various characters in animation and anime. This included voicing Ridley in Glitch Techs, Enid in OK K.O.! Let's Be Heroes, and Rutile Twins in Steven Universe. She voiced multiple characters in Bee and PuppyCat, Ash Graven in Final Space, Lainey in The Loud House, and characters in other productions. In 2018, Burch left her voice acting role of Mayuri Shiina for the English dub of Steins;Gate 0, who she had voiced from episodes 1-13 and credited as "Jackie Ross", citing scheduling conflicts, and apologized to fans. She voiced Sasha Braus in the English dub of the first three seasons of Attack on Titan.

In 2020, it was announced that she had signed on to write for the animated show, The Legend of Vox Machina. Burch revealed that she has a recording booth in her home which she used to work remotely during the COVID-19 pandemic.

In 2021, she began voicing Molly McGee, the protagonist of The Ghost and Molly McGee. She sings the series theme song, with co-star Dana Snyder, and musical numbers in other episodes. The show's creative team based the character around her life. Burch praised the series for "showcasing different aspects of Thai culture" and said that voicing Molly McGee was the first time she had voiced a character that reflected her heritage.

Personal life
Burch dated Must Come Down co-star David Fetzer until his death by accidental opioid overdose in 2012. She discussed this event as well as her own personal mental health issues during her appearance on Paul Gilmartin's The Mental Illness Happy Hour podcast and on Brian W. Foster's show Between the Sheets on Critical Roles YouTube channel. She suffers from chronic anxiety and credits her love of video games to playing Harvest Moon as a child as it was the only thing able to calm her down. She has spoken several times about her anxiety and the positive impact video games had on it. On July 1, 2022, Burch came out as queer and pansexual, saying that coming out felt important "for reasons I can't really explain" and that she had been dating a man for five years. She said it probably is not a shock because "half the characters I play are members of the rainbow fam," with some calling her every "queer nerd's favorite nerd."

Filmography

Video games

Animation

Live-action

Commercials

Dubbing roles

Anime

Awards and nominations

References

External links
 
 
 
 
 

Living people
Actresses from Phoenix, Arizona
American people of Thai descent
American video game actresses
American voice actresses
American web series actresses
Occidental College alumni
Primetime Emmy Award winners
21st-century American actresses
21st-century American women writers
21st-century American singers
Queer women
Pansexual actresses
Pansexual women
LGBT people from Arizona
American LGBT actors
1990 births